Complicity (or Retribution in the US market) is a 2000 film based on the 1993 novel Complicity by Iain Banks. The screenplay was written by Bryan Elsley, and directed by Gavin Millar. Both had previously adapted Banks's The Crow Road into a TV serial. The film marked the debut of Richard Madden.

Plot
Idealistic Scottish journalist Cameron Colley (Jonny Lee Miller) writes articles exposing establishment corruption. When some of those named in his articles are found brutally murdered, suspicion falls on him; and he is forced to begin an investigation to clear his name.

Cast

Locations
Scenes were filmed in Edinburgh and the Firth of Forth (particularly Inverkeithing, South Queensferry, and Inchmickery), and in Dunning, Glenturret, Kippen, Lochgoilhead, Lochailort, Glen Coe, and on Rannoch Moor.  One scene from the film was set in the Snaffle Bit bar in Sauchiehall Street, Glasgow, where actual bar staff and customers were used.

Critical reception
Time Out wrote, "It says a lot about the British film industry that dross like Rancid Aluminium commands a wide theatrical release, while this sensitively judged adaptation of Iain Banks' best novel goes straight to video...although it packs a little too much into its 99 minutes, it has clearly been made with love, as well as respect for the source material". Ian Nathan of Empire awarded it three stars out of five, saying "the sombre mood fits perfectly, Miller is good, and on the whole this is nasty enough to provoke. But it also offers nothing new. It is far too tentative in the violence department and therefore doesn't hang around long in the memory." He concluded that it was "low-key but not uninteresting." Lorien Haynes of Radio Times awarded it one star out of five, stating "You'd be better off going back to Iain Banks's original novel than waste your time with this convoluted and unsatisfactory adaptation." Haynes regarded Jonny Lee Miller as "endlessly bland", director Gavin Millar "all at sea" and the "excellent" Keeley Hawes as "wasted".

References

External links
Details of locations used in filming Complicity

2000 films
2000 drama films
2000 independent films
Scottish films
English-language Scottish films
British drama films
Films shot in Edinburgh
Films shot in Fife
Films based on British novels
British independent films
Films directed by Gavin Millar
Scottish drama films
2000s English-language films
2000s British films